Pádraig Faulkner (born 1994) is an Irish Gaelic footballer who plays for Kingscourt Stars and the Cavan county team.

Playing career

Club
Faulkner joined the Kingscourt Stars and played at all age levels.

Faulkner later joined the club's senior team. On 30 September 2012, Faulkner started at corner back against Mullahoran in his first county final, which ended in a draw. Faulkner kept his position for the replay on 7 October 2012. Faulkner scored a point from play but Kingscourt fell to a 1-8 to 0-7 defeat. 
 
On 12 October 2014 Faulkner started at centre back as Kingscourt faced Cavan Gaels in the county final. Faulkner was sent off in the 12th minute for a challenge on Cavan Gaels' Levi Murphy, and had to watch the rest of the game from the sideline. Kingscourt battled on with 14 men, but fell to a one point defeat.

On 11 October 2015, Faulkner played at full back as Kingscourt were in the county final once again, this time against Castlerahan. Kingscourt came out winners on a 1-9 to 0-11 scoreline.

Faulkner was forced off injured in Kingscourt's semi-final victory over Cavan Gaels in 2020. Despite his injury, he captained Kingscourt in the final against Crosserlough on 26 September. Faulkner scored a goal in the first half and Kingscourt were in front late on, but Crosserlough equalised to send the game to a replay. On 3 October, Faulkner started in the replay as Kingscourt lost by five points.

Inter-county

Minor and under-21
Faulkner first represented Cavan at minor level. He was on the Ulster Minor winning panel in 2011, but didn't play through injury.

Faulkner later progressed to the under-21 team. On 9 April 2014, Faulkner started in the Ulster final against Donegal. Cavan were winners on a 2-6 to 0-8 scoreline. Faulkner later played in the controversial semi-final defeat to eventual winners Dublin.

Senior
Faulkner joined the Cavan senior squad ahead of the 2016 season. On 29 May 2016, he made his championship debut against Armagh in the Ulster Championship.

Faulkner played at full back as Cavan bridged an 18-year gap to reach an Ulster final after defeating Armagh on 9 June 2019. On 23 June 2019, Faulkner started at full back in the Ulster final against Donegal. Cavan lost the final by five points.

On 22 November 2020, Cavan met Donegal in the Ulster Final for the second year in a row. Faulkner lined out at full back as Cavan bridged a 23-year gap with a 1-13 to 0-12 win. Cavan later exited the championship to Dublin at the semi-final stage. Faulkner received an All-Star nomination at the end of the season. On 19th February 2021, Faulkner was named at full back in the 2020 All Stars selection.

On 2 April 2022, Faulkner was at full back as Cavan faced Tipperary in the National League Division 4 final. Faulkner scored a point from play in the 2–10 to 0-15 victory.
On 5 June, Faulkner scored a goal in a Tailteann Cup quarter-final win over Fermanagh. Faulkner started the decider against Westmeath on 9 July. Faulkner scored a goal but Westmeath ended up four-point winners.

Honours
Cavan
 Ulster Senior Football Championship (1): 2020
 National Football League Division 4 (1): 2022
 Ulster Under-21 Football Championship (1): 2014
 Ulster Minor Football Championship (1): 2011

Kingscourt Stars
 Cavan Senior Football Championship (1): 2015

Individual
 All Star Award (1): 2020
 Irish News Ulster All-Star (1): 2020
 Gaelic Life Cavan Club Footballer of the Year (1): 2020
 Ulster GAA Writers' Association merit award (1): April 2016

References

1994 births
Living people
Cavan inter-county Gaelic footballers
Gaelic football backs
Irish schoolteachers
Kingscourt Stars Gaelic footballers